Soyuz MS-17 was a Soyuz spaceflight that was launched on 14 October 2020. It transported three crew members of the Expedition 63/64 crew to the International Space Station. Soyuz MS-17 was the 145th crewed flight of a Soyuz spacecraft. The crew consisted of a Russian commander and a Russian and American flight engineer.

The mission marked the first use of a new "ultrafast" two-orbit rendezvous flight plan with the Soyuz, which saw Soyuz MS-17 arrive at the ISS within approximately three hours after the launch.

On 19 March 2021, the crew of Soyuz MS-17 boarded their spacecraft to relocate it from Rassvet to Poisk to make way for the arrival and docking of the Soyuz MS-18 spacecraft, which launched on 9 April 2021 carrying cosmonauts Oleg Novitsky, Pyotr Dubrov and the astronaut of NASA, Mark T. Vande Hei to the ISS ahead of a six-month stay. The two spacecraft had a nine-day handover period before Soyuz MS-17 departed. This is necessary to avoid de-crewing the Russian Orbital Segment (ROS) of the ISS since no Russian cosmonaut was present aboard SpaceX Crew-1.

Crew

Backup crew

Reserve crew

Crew notes 
Early planning had listed Russian cosmonaut Nikolai Chub as the mission's Flight Engineer 2, pending a NASA decision on whether they would purchase more seats on the Soyuz. In May 2020, NASA purchased a Soyuz seat and assigned NASA astronaut Kathleen Rubins to the Flight Engineer 2 position, backed up by astronaut Mark T. Vande Hei.

Originally Russian cosmonauts Anatoli Ivanishin and Ivan Vagner were set to fly as Commander and Flight Engineer 1 respectively. In February 2020, however, the two cosmonauts were moved to the Soyuz MS-16 flight due to medical issues with the commander of Soyuz MS-16, Nikolai Tikhonov. Ivanishin and Vagner were replaced by Ryzhikov and Kud-Sverchkov. Babkin remains an active cosmonaut, but has not yet been to space, while Tikhonov has retired from Roscosmos' astronaut corps.

Reacting to the COVID-19 pandemic, Roscosmos implemented a two-cosmonaut reserve crew to ensure the flight could go on with no delays, in the unlikely event both the prime and backup crews fall ill. It was not confirmed whether NASA planned to add an astronaut of their own to the reserve crew.

Gallery

References

External links 
 Launch «Souz МS-17» (Youtube)

Crewed Soyuz missions
Spacecraft launched in 2020
2020 in Russia
Spacecraft launched by Soyuz-2 rockets
Spacecraft which reentered in 2021
Fully civilian crewed orbital spaceflights